The 2001–02 NCAA Division I men's basketball season began on November 9, 2001, progressed through the regular season and conference tournaments, and concluded with the 2002 NCAA Men's Division I Basketball Tournament Championship Game on April 1, 2002 at the Georgia Dome in Atlanta, Georgia. The Maryland Terrapins won their first NCAA national championship with a 64–52 victory over the Indiana Hoosiers.

Season headlines 
 The preseason AP All-American team was named on November 6. Jason Williams of Duke was the unanimous leading vote-getter (72 of 72 votes). The rest of the team included Kareem Rush of Missouri (47 votes), Tayshaun Prince of Kentucky (46), Casey Jacobsen of Stanford (45) and Frank Williams of Illinois (31).
 Jason Conley of Virginia Military Institute becomes the first freshman ever to win the season scoring title, averaging 29.3 points in 28 games.
 Senior John Linehan of Providence becomes the all-time Division I steals leader with 385 for his career, while fellow senior Desmond Cambridge of Alabama A&M coincidentally finishes his career with the second highest steals total of 377.
 March 1 – Sophomore Ronald Blackshear of Marshall ties an NCAA record by making 11 consecutive three-point shots in a game against Akron, but also makes 14 total in the second-highest single game output in NCAA history.

Major rule changes 
Beginning in 2001–02, the following rules changes were implemented:
 Both direct and indirect technical fouls penalized by two shots and returned to point of interruption.
 Officials could check an official courtside monitor to determine if a try was a three- or two-point attempt, regardless of whether the try was successful.

Season outlook

Pre-season polls 
The top 25 from the AP and ESPN/USA Today Coaches Polls November 5, 2001.

Conference membership changes 

These schools joined new conferences for the 2001–02 season.

Regular season

Conference winners and tournaments

Statistical leaders

Post-season tournaments

NCAA tournament

Final Four – Georgia Dome, Atlanta, Georgia

National Invitation tournament

Semifinals & finals 

 Third Place – Temple 65, Syracuse 64

Award winners

Consensus All-American teams

Major player of the year awards 
 Wooden Award: Jason Williams, Duke
 Naismith Award: Jason Williams, Duke
 Associated Press Player of the Year: Jason Williams, Duke
 NABC Player of the Year: Drew Gooden, Kansas & Jason Williams, Duke
 Oscar Robertson Trophy (USBWA): Jason Williams, Duke
 Adolph Rupp Trophy: Jason Williams, Duke
 Sporting News Player of the Year: Jason Williams, Duke

Major freshman of the year awards 
 USBWA Freshman of the Year: T. J. Ford, Texas
 Sporting News Freshman of the Year: Maurice Williams, Alabama

Major coach of the year awards 
 Associated Press Coach of the Year: Ben Howland, Pittsburgh
 Henry Iba Award (USBWA): Ben Howland, Pittsburgh
 NABC Coach of the Year: Kelvin Sampson, Oklahoma
 Naismith College Coach of the Year: Ben Howland, Pittsburgh
 CBS/Chevrolet Coach of the Year: Kelvin Sampson, Oklahoma
 Sporting News Coach of the Year: Ben Howland, Pittsburgh

Other major awards 
 Pete Newell Big Man Award (Best big man): Drew Gooden, Kansas
 NABC Defensive Player of the Year: John Linehan, Providence
 Frances Pomeroy Naismith Award (Best player under 6'0): Steve Logan, Cincinnati
 Lowe's Senior CLASS Award (top senior): Juan Dixon, Maryland
 Robert V. Geasey Trophy (Top player in Philadelphia Big 5): Lynn Greer, Temple
 NIT/Haggerty Award (Top player in New York City metro area): Marcus Hatten, St. John's
 Chip Hilton Player of the Year Award (Strong personal character): Juan Dixon, Maryland

Coaching changes

References